is a Japanese football player. He plays for Vonds Ichihara.

Club statistics

References

External links

1987 births
Living people
Hannan University alumni
Association football people from Tokyo
Japanese footballers
J2 League players
Japan Football League players
Kataller Toyama players
FC Ryukyu players
Vonds Ichihara players
Association football midfielders